Uzbekistan competed at the 2012 Summer Olympics in London, from July 27 to August 12, 2012. This was the nation's fifth consecutive appearance at the Olympics. The National Olympic Committee of the Republic of Uzbekistan sent the nation's smallest delegation to the Games in the post-Soviet era. A total of 54 athletes, 36 men and 18 women, competed in 13 sports. There was only a single competitor in fencing, rhythmic and trampoline gymnastics, shooting and tennis.

Notable Uzbek athletes featured tennis player Denis Istomin (ranked thirty-fourth in the world by the Association of Tennis Professionals), road cyclist and former world junior champion Sergey Lagutin, and sprint canoer Vadim Menkov, who nearly missed out of the medal standings in Beijing. Sprinter Guzal Khubbiyeva and trampoline gymnast Ekaterina Khilko became the first Uzbek female athletes to compete in four Olympic games. Meanwhile, swimmers Ranohon Amanova and Yulduz Kuchkarova, both at age 18, were the youngest athletes of the team. Light heavyweight boxer and double Asian Games champion Elshod Rasulov was the nation's flag bearer at the opening ceremony.

Uzbekistan left London originally with four Olympic medals (one gold and three bronze), tying with Sydney for the nation's overall medal standings. Freestyle wrestler Artur Taymazov, who defended his super heavyweight title for the third time, became the most successful Uzbek athlete in history with a total of four Olympic medals. Another freestyle wrestler Soslan Tigiev collected his second Olympic medal in the men's middleweight division, by winning an Olympic bronze medal. Judoka Rishod Sobirov managed to repeat his bronze medal from Beijing. Boxer Abbos Atoev recaptured his nation's sporting success at these games, by winning an Olympic bronze medal after eight years.

On 7 November 2012, the International Olympic Committee stripped Soslan Tigiev of his bronze medal after testing positive for the prohibited substance methylhexaneamine. On 23 July 2019, the International Olympic Committee stripped Artur Taymazov of his gold medal after testing positive for the prohibited substance. In 2020, after the disqualification of a number of athletes in a weightlifting men's 105 kg event, the bronze medal in this event was redistributed to Ivan Efremov.

Medalists

Competitors

Athletics

Uzbekistani athletes have so far achieved qualifying standards in the following athletics events (up to a maximum of 3 athletes in each event at the 'A' Standard, and 1 at the 'B' Standard):

Key
 Note – Ranks given for track events are within the athlete's heat only
 Q = Qualified for the next round
 q = Qualified for the next round as a fastest loser or, in field events, by position without achieving the qualifying target
 NR = National record
 N/A = Round not applicable for the event
 Bye = Athlete not required to compete in round

Men
Track & road events

Field events

Combined events – Decathlon

Women
Track & road events

Field events

Boxing

Uzbekistan so far qualified boxers for the following events

Men

Canoeing

Sprint
Uzbekistan qualified boats for the following events

Qualification Legend: FA = Qualify to final (medal); FB = Qualify to final B (non-medal)

Cycling

Road

Fencing

Uzbekistan qualified 1 fencer.

Men

Gymnastics

Artistic
Women

 Galiulina was initially suspended and later excluded from the games after testing positive for the banned diuretic drug furosemide.

Rhythmic

Trampoline

Judo

Uzbekistan qualified 6 judokas. Abdullo Tangriev qualified in the men's +100 kg category, but withdrew from the Games.

Men

Shooting

Women

Swimming

Uzbekistani swimmers have further achieved qualifying standards in the following events (up to a maximum of 2 swimmers in each event at the Olympic Qualifying Time (OQT), and potentially 1 at the Olympic Selection Time (OST)):

Women

Taekwondo

Uzbekistan qualified the following quota places.

Tennis

Weightlifting

Uzbekistan qualified 6 weightlifters.
Men

Women

Wrestling

Uzbekistan qualified 8 men.

Key
  - Victory by Fall.
  - Decision by Points - the loser with technical points.
  - Decision by Points - the loser without technical points.

Men's freestyle

Men's Greco-Roman

References

Nations at the 2012 Summer Olympics
2012
Summer Olympics